Nonda (1922–2005) was a Greek expressionist artist.

Nonda may also refer to:

 Shabani Nonda (born 1977), DR Congolese football player
 Nonda Katsalidis (born 1951), Greek-Australian architect
 Nonda plum
 Nonda (volcano), in Vella Lavella, Solomon Islands
 Nonda inc, A connected car company in silicon valley